Campolaemus perexilis was a species of very small, air-breathing land snail, a terrestrial pulmonate gastropod mollusk in the family Vertiginidae, the whorls snails. This species was endemic to the island of Saint Helena; it is now extinct.

References

Vertiginidae
Extinct gastropods
Gastropods described in 1892
Taxonomy articles created by Polbot